Henry Allen Holmes (born January 31, 1933) was the United States Ambassador to Portugal from 1982 to 1985 and a career diplomat.

Biography
Born in Bucharest, Romania to American parents, Holmes received his high school education at St. Paul's School in Concord, New Hampshire, graduating in June 1950. 

He earned his A.B. in 1954 at Princeton University, where he was a classmate of Donald Rumsfeld and participated in the NROTC program.

Holmes then joined the US Marine Corps, leaving as an infantry captain in 1957 to study at Sciences Po in Paris.  He graduated with a certificate in 1958 and was hired as an intelligence research analyst for the US Department of State that same year.  Holmes began his diplomatic career by joining the Foreign Service in 1959; his first posting was as a consular and political officer in Yaoundé, Cameroon.  He continued to advance through various State Department positions for the next two decades, including posts in Rome and Paris, until his appointment as Ambassador to Portugal in 1982. From 1985 to 1989, he served as US Assistant Secretary of State for Politico-Military Affairs.  

In 1989, he was appointed Ambassador at Large for Burdensharing in which he ensured balanced security responsibility among NATO members, Japan, and other US allies.  Following this he was nominated by President Clinton to be Assistant Secretary of Defense for Special Operations and Low-Intensity Conflict.  During this time his office generated a plan for the Department of Defense to launch new national counterterrorism strategy to respond to "the gauntlet the international terrorists have thrown at our feet," but as mentioned in the 9/11 report, the paper never went beyond the Office of the Principal Deputy Under Secretary of Defense for Policy.  

He is currently an adjunct professor at Georgetown University's School of Foreign Service  and a member of Diplomats and Military Commanders for Change.

Family
H. Allen Holmes is married and has two children.

See also

References

Ronald Reagan Presidential Library Nomination & Appointments

External links
Princeton University, Memorial
H. Allen Holmes ’54 
U.S. policy on arms control, 1986 Address to Council on Foreign Relations
Civil Affairs: Reflections of the Future, 1997 address to Worldwide Civil Affairs Conference
Military Operations in the Post-Cold War Era, 1997 address to Intelligence in Partnership Conference

1933 births
Living people
St. Paul's School (New Hampshire) alumni
Princeton University alumni
United States Marine Corps officers
Sciences Po alumni
United States Foreign Service personnel
Ambassadors of the United States to Portugal
United States Assistant Secretaries of State
United States Assistant Secretaries of Defense
Walsh School of Foreign Service faculty